Trick or Treat is a 1952 animated short film produced by Walt Disney Productions and released by RKO Radio Pictures. The cartoon, which takes place on Halloween night, follows a series of pranks between Donald Duck and his nephews with Witch Hazel. The film was directed by Jack Hannah and features the voices of Clarence Nash as Donald and his nephews, and June Foray as Hazel.

The film introduced the song "Trick or Treat for Halloween" which was written by Mack David, Al Hoffman, and Jerry Livingston and performed by The Mellomen.<ref>[http://www.disneyshorts.org/years/1952/trickortreat.html Trick or Treat] ' at The Encyclopedia of Disney Animated Shorts</ref>

Plot
The film opens with the song "Trick or Treat for Halloween", the lyrics of which tell the film's moral – one must be generous on Halloween or face trouble.

One Halloween night, Witch Hazel observes Huey, Dewey, and Louie trick-or-treating. When the trio goes to their uncle Donald Duck's house, Donald decides to prank the boys (giving them a "trick" instead of a treat). So instead of giving them candy, he intentionally puts firecrackers in their bags, then pulls a string that dumps a bucket of water on their heads. After Donald bids farewell to the boys, the discouraged nephews go and sit on the curb.

But Hazel, who was watching the drama unfold, approaches the boys and tries to encourage them. When she discovers that they believe in witches, she offers to help them get their treats from Donald after all. At first, she tries to convince Donald herself, but he skeptically retorts, yanks on her stretchy nose, and pranks her as well with a bucket of water, not believing she is a real witch. Realizing that the job may be harder than she anticipated, Hazel tells the boys she will use her magic for this situation. In another location, a scene paying homage to Shakespeare's Macbeth shows Hazel and the nephews concocting a magic potion, adding somewhat more whimsical ingredients than the Three Witches in Macbeth (such as, "Eye of needle, tongue of shoe, hand of clock that points at two!", etc). After testing the potion, Hazel fills an insecticide sprayer (similar in appearance to a Flit gun) with the potion and returns to Donald's house with the nephews.

Upon arriving back at Donald's house, Hazel sprays the potion on an assortment of objects (a Jack-o'-lantern, a can of paint, three fence posts, and a gate) causing them to become animated or anthropomorphic. Donald, stunned at the magic being displayed before him, immediately gives in and agrees to treat his nephews, but when Hazel refers to him as a pushover, he changes his mind. Donald then locks his pantry and swallows the key. Hazel then uses the potion on Donald's feet to give her control of their maneuverability and commands them to kick out the key, causing Donald to perform a crazy dance. But when the key is kicked out, Donald throws it under the pantry door. Enraged, Hazel casts a spell "that's double-grim!" on Donald's feet by spraying them even harder and ordering them to "smash that door down" with Donald. This is initially unsuccessful, so Hazel commands him to take a longer start (About a mile or two!), and he literally runs even faster right before he rams down the pantry door and is left unconscious on the floor in defeat.

In the end, Huey, Dewey, and Louie collect their treats and Hazel flies off into the night. A final shot shows the enchanted Jack-o'-lantern from earlier suddenly pop onto the screen saying "Boo!" to the viewers before smiling.

Voice cast
Clarence Nash as Donald Duck, Huey, Dewey, Louie, the Scaredy Cat, and Beelzebub
June Foray as Hazel the Witch

Adaptations

A print adaptation by Carl Barks was published simultaneously in the Donald Duck comic book. Barks was given a storyboard of the film by Ralph Wright while production of the film was still in progress. Barks was asked to create a 32-page comic adaptation, yet Barks did not believe he had enough material. In the end, he wound up making a lot of his own material, creating new characters such as Smorgie the Bad, a villainous eight-armed ogre serving Witch Hazel.

When the final product was sent to the publisher, Barks' segment with Smorgie was rejected, and the story was cut to 27 pages. To fill out the rest of the comic book, Barks created an additional story called "Hobblin' Gobblins." The original story was later restored with the publication of the Carl Barks Library.

Disneyland Records also produced an audio adaptation that was narrated by Ginny Tyler. This version was 12 minutes long and also included a song and story from the Haunted Mansion Disneyland attraction.

Releases
1952 – Original theatrical release
1957 – Disneyland, episode #3.15: "All About Magic" (TV)
1972 – The Mouse Factory, episode #1.4: "Spooks and Magic" (TV)
1977 – The Wonderful World of Disney episode #5: "Halloween Hall o' Fame" (TV)
1983 – A Disney Halloween (TV Special)
1998 – The Ink and Paint Club, episode #1.34: "Donald's Nephews" (TV)
2002 – Mickey's House of Villains (DTV)
2010 – 13 Nights of Halloween (TV)

Home media
The short was released on November 11, 2008 on Walt Disney Treasures: The Chronological Donald, Volume Four: 1951-1961.

Additional releases include:
c. 1965 – Super 8 release
1990 – "Cartoon Classics: Halloween Haunts" (VHS)
2000 – The Legend of Sleepy Hollow, Gold Classics Collection (VHS and DVD)
2000 – The Black Cauldron, Gold Classics Collection (VHS and DVD)
2001 – Disney Cartoon Classics - Birdbrain Donald (International Video CD Release)2002 – Mickey's House of Villains (VHS and DVD)
2010 – The Black Cauldron, 25th Anniversary Edition (DVD)
2020 – Disney+ release
2021 – The Black Cauldron'', Disney Movie Club Exclusive (Blu-ray Disc)

References

1950s Disney animated short films
1952 animated films
Donald Duck short films
American films about Halloween
Films directed by Jack Hannah
Films produced by Walt Disney
Films about witchcraft
Films scored by Paul Smith (film and television composer)
1952 short films
1950s English-language films
American animated short films
RKO Pictures short films
RKO Pictures animated short films
Films about ducks
Animated films about birds